1965 Argentine Air Force C-54 disappearance (also known as TC-48 Flight or The Cadets Flight) refers to the disappearance of an Argentine Air Force Douglas C-54G carrying cadet graduates from the Military Aviation School that disappeared between Howard Air Force Base in Panama and El Salvador International Airport on 3 November 1965. Last contact with the aircraft was 30 or 40 minutes after take-off, when the pilot reported a fire in one of the engines and notified the control tower of San José International Airport in Costa Rica that they intended to divert there. The aircraft never arrived and all passengers and crew are missing, presumed dead. The disappearance is considered the greatest mystery of Argentine aviation.

Flight 

The C-54 took off from El Palomar on October 31, 1965 to the Military Aviation School. The crew consisted of 9 members; 5 officers and 54 cadets, thus totaling 68 occupants. The training flight would take them to San Francisco. During the trip, a second Douglas DC-4 was used, the TC-43 that carried the rest of the promotion. Both aircraft departed the following day, flew to the Cerro Moreno base in Chile where, after a technical stopover, the flight continued to Las Palmas base in Lima, Peru. There they spent the night and incorporated two cadets from the Peruvian Air Force, which were distributed in both planes. On November 2 they flew to Panama with a technical stopover in Guayaquil (Ecuador); and the next day, they had to complete the journey between the Howard Air Force Base and San Salvador International Airport (El Salvador).

Aircraft 

The aircraft involved was a Douglas C-54G four-engined transport aircraft of the Argentine Air Force, serialled TC-48 (msn 35983), first flown in 1945.

The aircraft was assigned to the 1st Air Brigade based in El Palomar and immediately began to be used for military personnel, officials and relatives relocation flights. From 20 October to 19 November 1964 she participated in the Final Instruction Trip of the XXX Class of cadets of the EAM, in the company of Douglas DC-4 'TC-44'.

During the 1964/65 Antarctic campaign she was part of the Antarctic Task Force (FATA). Among the missions in which the machine participated during that campaign, the cosmic measurements in flight stand out, by means of equipment mounted on board the device and different launches of supplies on the Esperanza Base. On February 5, TC-48 was part of the so-called Operation Matienzo, supporting the legendary C-47 TA-05, at the crossing to the white continent. On March 15, 1965, it would give the same support to the BS-03 Grumman HU-16B aircraft. There are reports that indicate that in February 1965, the Douglas DC-4 TC-48 managed to fly over the Antarctic Circle. On May 7, 1965, by order of the Executive Power of the Nation, the Argentine Air Force dispatched two Douglas DC-4 aircraft (TC-48 and TC-42) to Santo Domingo carrying troops, medical supplies and medicine to attend to the victims of the revolutionary events registered in the Dominican Republic. On September 22, 1965, again supported the TA-05 in the crossing made from the continent to Antarctica.

Accident

Around 05:43 (-5 GMT) the TC-43 took off from Howard Air Force Base on the Pacific side of the Panama Canal Zone and at 05:49 the TC-48 did the same. Both aircraft would follow the same route to San Salvador International Airport, known as "Mike", having set a cruising altitude of 6,500 feet (2,145 m) and keeping sporadic radio contact for a distance of about 1,150 km that would take about 3:45 h of flight.

Communication lost 

The last two transmissions from the aircraft were at 06:27 when the TC-48 reports to Panama tower confirming reached to position "Mike-5" without incident at an altitude of 6500 and heading for San Salvador. The "Mike-5" position is a navigational point close to Escudo de Veraguas island on the Panamanian caribbean Mosquitoes Gulf of the Bocas del Toro Province. The weather conditions for this first part of the route were not the best, forecast indicated severe turbulence, heavy rain, and visibility from very limited to zero.

At 06:36 the pilot reported fire on engine 3 and engine 4 stopped working, and will attempt to land or ditch the aircraft to the water, the signal was pickup by Tegucigalpa ATC and a Lacsa cargo plane pilot. The cargo plane pilot recommended to land in Limón International Airport or El Coco International Airport, now called Juan Santamaría International Airport, but the aircraft never arrived.

From this moment on, a large number of cross reports began to emerge, where schedules and data supposedly provided by the TC-48 pilots mismatch, like a third unconfirmed communication at 07:05 stating that the TC-48 reported that it was flying over Bocas del Toro, heading towards Puerto Limón runway, where the emergency had already been declared and firefighters and ambulances were being mobilized while waiting for the aircraft.

Reported sightings 
In 2008, Teletica journalist Gerardo Zamora interviewed several witnesses that indicate the aircraft entered to Costa Rican territory by Sixaola, then was seen on Valle La Estrella, and a last witness indicate that saw survivors near Telire, all communities close to the Talamanca Range.

Passengers and crew 

The aircraft was carrying nine Argentine crew members and 53 cadet passengers from Argentina, one cadet from Peru and five officers. Of the 59 passengers, 53 were Argentine cadets, five Argentine military officers and one Peruvian cadet.

Search 
Initial searches for survivors were made by United States Navy until November 17, 1965 when attempts ceased. Relatives rejected the official version and continued to demand the search of the plane in the Costa Rican jungle, convinced that the aircraft could well be in some inaccessible place and not in the seabed. The suspicion gained even more force when it became known that some of the elements supposedly rescued and offered as evidence, which belonged to one of the disappeared cadets, had been entrusted by their owner to a colleague who was travelling on the other plane. He later handed them over to his superiors. In addition, at that point it was already certain that the aircraft were not in perfect condition and that the TC-48 was flying overweight. Relatives travelled to Central America to restart the search on their own. This is how groups of relatives of cadets and officers entered the Costa Rican jungle over and over again and made contact with the aborigines who lived around the Cordillera de Talamanca, looking for any clue that would allow them to find the whereabouts of their loved ones. However, they only encountered misleading versions, ladino characters, fear and reluctance of the natives, and insurmountable difficulties; ingredients of a mystery that seemed to grow with the passing of the months. Then they would inevitably return empty-handed.

A total of 23 expeditions were made to the Talamanca in Costa Rica jungle, and more than 50 flights in planes and helicopters, the search was stopped in 1967. For the Civil Aviation of Costa Rica and for the relatives, the aircraft is somewhere in the jungle. In 2015 the Argentine Air Forces carried out four searches called Esperanza, both by land and by sea, which ended without results.

Investigation 

After disappearance, an investigation carried out by the United States concluded that the aircraft fell to the sea between Panama and Costa Rica, 30 km from the coast. A de-classified video of a United States Navy (USN) helicopter marking the location of life-vests and objects in the sea, that later were shown to family members. Argentine Air Force authorities accepted the conclusions reached by the US experts

In popular culture

Books 
The book TC-48, the cadets plane, by Ricardo Becerra, a former Army lieutenant and brother of cadet Héctor, mentions thirteen witnesses who saw him fly low in the jungle.

Documentary 
In December 2018 the documentary film The Last Search was released in Córdoba, Argentina in local movie theaters, in which Cecilia Viberti, pilot Esteban Viberti's daughter, describes the searches made in Talamanca, Costa Rica and shares her thoughts about whether the aircraft is located in Costa Rica.

See also 
Malaysia Airlines Flight 370
List of missing aircraft
List of accidents and incidents involving military aircraft (1960–1974)
List of accidents and incidents involving the Douglas DC-4
List of aircraft of the Argentine Air Force

References 

Accidents and incidents involving the Douglas DC-4
Missing aircraft
Aviation accidents and incidents in 1965
1965 in Argentina